
Year 611 (DCXI) was a common year starting on Friday (link will display the full calendar) of the Julian calendar. The denomination 611 for this year has been used since the early medieval period, when the Anno Domini calendar era became the prevalent method in Europe for naming years.

Events 
 By place 
 Persian Empire 
 Byzantine–Persian War: The Persian army under Shahrbaraz captures Antioch, and most of the remaining Byzantine fortresses in Syria and Mesopotamia. King Khosrau II is re-establishing a neo-Persian Empire, and intensifies his war effort. The Byzantine army, ruined by defeat and corruption, offers only half-hearted opposition.

 Britain 
 Cynegils becomes king of the West Saxons, or Wessex, after the death of his uncle Ceolwulf (according to the Anglo-Saxon Chronicle). He rules from 611 to 643 and shares power to some extent with his eldest son, Cwichelm, who may have been given Upper Wessex (approximate date).

 By topic 
 Religion 
 The Four Gates Pagoda, located in central Shandong Province (East China), is completed.

Births 
 July 7 – Eudoxia Epiphania, daughter of Byzantine emperor Heraclius 
 Leo II, Pope of the Catholic Church (d. 683)

Deaths 
 Arnoald, Bishop of Metz (approximate date)
 Ceolwulf, king of Wessex (approximate date)
 Comentiolus, Byzantine general (approximate date)
 Romilda of Friuli, regent duchess of Friuli (approximate date)

References